Arthon-en-Retz (literally Arthon in Retz) is a former commune in the Loire-Atlantique department in western France. On 1 January 2016, it was merged into the new commune of Chaumes-en-Retz. Arthon-en-Retz is situated 10 km east of Pornic, 39 km west of Nantes and 41 south of Saint-Nazaire.

Population
The inhabitants are called Arthonnais.

Personalities
 Mickaël Landreau - footballer (Lille OSC)
 Anthony Charteau - cyclist

See also
Communes of the Loire-Atlantique department

References

Former communes of Loire-Atlantique
Populated places disestablished in 2016